Men's handball at the 2006 Asian Games was held in Al-Gharafa Indoor Hall, Al-Rayyan from 3 December 3 to 14 December 2006.

Squads

Results
All times are Arabia Standard Time (UTC+03:00)

Preliminary league

Group A

Group B

Group C

Group D

Placement 13–15

Semifinals

Placement 13–14

Placement 9–12

Semifinals

Placement 11–12

Placement 9–10

Main round

Group E

Group F

Placement 5–8

Placement 7–8

Placement 5–6

Final round

Semifinals

Bronze medal match

Gold medal match

Final standing

References

Results

External links
Official website

Men